SING! is an annual student-run musical production put on by some high schools in New York City. It is a theater competition between the various grades, with the setup between grades differing from school to school (such as sophomore-freshman vs. seniors vs. juniors, senior-sophomore vs. junior-freshman or freshman-senior vs. sophomore-junior).

SING! was conceived by Bella Tillis (1913-2013), a music teacher at Midwood High School in Brooklyn, New York in 1947. 

A Library of Congress archive of the papers of entertainer Danny Kaye, who went to high school with Tillis, contains playbills of SING! performances at Midwood High School from the years 1953–1957.

The 1989 film Sing is based on a fictional SING! production. According to The New York Times review of the movie, the film's production notes say that Paul Simon, Neil Diamond, Barbra Streisand, Carole King and Neil Sedaka, who attended various Brooklyn and Queens high schools in the mid to late 1950s, took part in SING! productions. Other SING! celebrities include Stuyvesant High School's Tim Robbins and Paul Reiser.

Inter-SING
Inter-SINGs are SING competitions held between different high schools. They have been held in Brooklyn, Queens, Staten Island and Long Island. Sheepshead Bay High School had a long string of victories in the three-school competition called InterSchool SING (or Inter-SING) during the 1970s and 1980s, punctuated by wins by Lincoln High School.

Inter-Sing first started on Staten Island in the late 1970's between Tottenville and Susan Wagner High Schools. More recently, Susan E. Wagner High School won the Staten Island competition in 2007 with their Junior production of "The JSV Circus"; Staten Island Technical High School won in 2008 with their Senior-Sophomore production entitled "Carnicus"; and Tottenville High School, which participated for the first time, won in 2009 with Senior Sing X's production of "Narneville", a twisted fairy tale.
 Recent
Brooklyn Inter-SING winners include Edward R. Murrow High School (2014-2015) and Midwood High School (2016). Inter-SING 2015 in Brooklyn was broadcast on live TV in Brooklyn.

References

Public education in New York City
Theatre in New York City